Bruno Amadio (9 November 191122 September 1981), popularly known as Bragolin, and also known as Angelo Bragolin and Giovanni Bragolin, was the creator of the group of paintings known as Crying Boys. The paintings feature a variety of tearful children looking morosely straight ahead. They are sometimes called "Gypsy boys" although there is nothing specifically linking them to the Romani people.

He was an academically trained painter, working in post-war Venice as painter and restorer, producing the Crying Boy pictures for tourists. At least 65 such paintings were made under the name Bragolin, reproductions of which were sold worldwide. He was not always paid royalties for the reproductions. In the 1970s he was found to be alive and well-to-do and still painting in Padua. Claims that he fled to Spain after the war, painting children from a local orphanage which subsequently burned down, appear to be an unconfirmed urban legend.

References

1911 births
1981 deaths
20th-century Italian painters
Italian male painters
20th-century Italian male artists